Indian Creek is a stream in northeast Dallas County, Missouri. It is a tributary of the Niangua River.

Indian Creek was named for a former Indian village along its course.

See also
List of rivers of Missouri

References

Rivers of Dallas County, Missouri
Rivers of Missouri